Stictoleptura dichroa is a species of beetle in the family Cerambycidae found in China, Korea and Russia.

References

Stictoleptura
Beetles described in 1871
Beetles of Asia